Ahmad Kaabour (born 9 July 1955, in Beirut, Lebanon) is a Lebanese singer, songwriter, music composer and actor. He is perhaps best known for his song Ounadikom which he composed in 1975 upon the outbreak of the Lebanese civil war.

Background
Ahmad Kaabour was born on 9 July 1955 in Beirut, Lebanon to Mahmoud Kaabour and Fatima Al-Ghoul. Ahmad and his siblings grew up in the Basta area of Beirut before moving to Al-Horsh neighbourhood. His father Mahmoud (aka Al-Rasheedi) was a prominent violinist who played along the biggest musicians of the time. His father's work cultivated his musical background alongside other influences.

Career

Singer
Kaabour is best known for his song Ounadikom ("I Call Out To You"), based on a poem written by Tawfiq Ziad. He composed the song at the age of 19 in 1975 with the outbreak of the Lebanese Civil War, and his musical endeavors have continued ever since.

Early on in his career, he produced a body of work dedicated to Palestine and its people, which evolved to encompass issues concerning his home country Lebanon and its struggles. His music portrays his belief in the power of music in shedding light on humanitarian causes, and its ability to make a difference. He has released six studio albums to date, and continues to produce music for children's theater, television, film and other media.

Actor
Kaabour started his career as an actor by taking roles in several plays during the 70s and 80s, as in "Shi Fashil" with Ziad Rahbani in 1983. Later on he appeared "Nagi El Ali" alongside Nour El Sharif in 1991. He made his international film debut playing the featured role of Wadie Haddad in the historical epic Carlos, which premiered at the 2010 Cannes Film Festival.

Discography
Ounadikom (1976)
Hob
Nehna El Nas
Ouandikom (1996 Re-release)
Sawton A'ali (2002)
Ounadikom (2004 Re-release)
Baddi Ghanni Lannas (2010)
Ramadaniyat Ahmad Kaabour (2011)
Ahmad Kaabour yoghanni Omar El Z'inni (2011)

References

External links
 
 

1955 births
Living people
20th-century Lebanese male actors
20th-century Lebanese male singers
Male actors from Beirut
Lebanese University alumni
21st-century Lebanese male actors
Lebanese male stage actors
Musicians from Beirut